Southern Heights is a neighborhood in southwestern Lexington, Kentucky, United States. Its boundaries are the University of Kentucky Arboretum and Central Baptist Hospital to the north, Nicholasville Road to the west, and Edgemoor Drive/Blueberry Road to the south.

Neighborhood statistics

 Area: 
 Population: 470
 Population density: 2,760 people per square mile
 Median household income (2010): $54,850

References

Neighborhoods in Lexington, Kentucky